Alan Hill (born 3 November 1943) is an English former professional footballer who played as a goalkeeper, making over 250 appearances in the Football League for three clubs between 1960 and 1970.

Career
Born in Barnsley, Hill began his career with the youth team of hometown club Barnsley, turning professional in 1960. After making over 130 appearances, he signed for Rotherham United in 1966.

Hill ended his career in 1970 with Nottingham Forest, after breaking his arm.

Between 1976 and 1987, Hill was the licensee of the Rancliffe Arms in Bunny, Nottinghamshire.

References
General
Post War English & Scottish Football League A - Z Player's Transfer Database

Specific

1943 births
Living people
English footballers
Barnsley F.C. players
Rotherham United F.C. players
Nottingham Forest F.C. players
English Football League players
Association football goalkeepers